Lehigh University has many buildings, old and new, on its three campuses. When the university was founded in 1865, it took over several buildings from the surrounding property. One which remains today is Christmas Hall, now part of Christmas-Saucon Hall.

Asa Packer Campus
The original campus contains most of Lehigh's academic and residential buildings and sits on the north slope of South Mountain overlooking Bethlehem's Southside. It has expanded many times during Lehigh's history as surrounding land has been purchased and as existing buildings around the campus have been acquired and converted. During recent years, intense work has been done on this campus. This has included the construction, expansion, or renovation of several buildings and significant improvements in traffic flow and pedestrian areas.  Notable among the latter is the New Street corridor/Farrington Square north entrance.

Alumni Memorial Building (1925)

The Alumni Memorial Building is a Gothic building near the center of campus, housing the Visitor Center, the Office of Admissions, the Alumni Association, as well as the Office of the President. The building is a memorial to the 1,921 Lehigh alumni who served in World War I and the 46 who died. Plaques commemorating those who served in subsequent wars are situated in the lobby. The graceful building was meticulously conceived and designed by Lehigh alumni Theodore G. Visscher and James Lindsey Burley as an "architecturally unique memorial", as Mr. Yates notes.  It took five years to complete.

Brodhead House (1979)
Brodhead is an air-conditioned six-story high-rise building with an elevator. These four-person suites house 194 second-year students and students living in two themes of the Upper Class Experience Residential Communities. Each suite has two double bedrooms or one double and two single bedrooms, and all suites have a furnished common area and a private bathroom.

Farrington Square (2002)
The northern edge of campus, Farrington Square consists of apartment style undergraduate housing, the university bookstore, retail space, and a parking garage. Its architecture reflects some changing attitudes towards South Bethlehem by breaking the tradition of creating a visual wall between the campus and city. Instead, a plaza of buildings now opens out to the city along the New Street corridor/4th street, and directly into town.

Centennial Complex (1965, 1971)
The six "Upper Centennials" (Congdon, Emery, Leavitt, McConn, Smiley and Thornburg) were built in 1965 for the university's 100th anniversary.  They were 44 man upperclass residences, which selectively recruited rising freshman to join them.  The Centennials competed in intramurals, had social dues and parties, elected officers and had a similar structure to the Greek fraternities. They proved so popular that construction of six more was started in 1969, being the "Lower Centennials" (Beardslee, Carothers, Palmer, Stevens, Stoughton, and Williams).  However, the introduction of co-education resulted in three of the new ones becoming Lehigh's first female residences in 1971 and the remaining three becoming non-selective men's residences.

Chandler-Ullmann Hall (1883, 1938)
These adjoining buildings used to be the William H Chandler Chemistry Building (1883) and the Harry M. Ullmann Chemistry Laboratory (1938). William Chandler was appointed as professor of chemistry in 1871 and retired in 1905; during this time he guided the department and gained a national reputation for his work.  The building was home to the Department of Chemistry until it moved into the new Seeley G. Mudd Building in 1976. Beginning in 1976, it housed the Department of Art, Architecture and Design and the Department of Psychology. After an extensive $31 million interior renovation, in 2019, the Department of Mathematics moved into the building, which it now shares with the Department of Psychology. The structure is considered by some architectural historians to be the first "modern" laboratory because of its system of ventilation and the design of its laboratories. The building, which won a prize for design at the Paris Exposition of 1889, was designated a National Historic Chemical Landmark by the American Chemical Society in 1994.

Christmas-Saucon Hall (1866, 1872)
Christmas Hall is the oldest structure on the Lehigh University campus and pre-dates the founding of the university.

In 1864, before plans for the university were drawn up, Asa Packer had sold a lot on what would soon become Lehigh's campus, to a group of Moravians. They quite promptly erected a stone church, and services were commenced before the year was out.  However, the young group soon received notification of Asa Packer's plans to found a university on the land all around the young Church. After negotiations, the Moravians agreed to move, provided another suitable plot of land was granted them. This was accomplished with the donation to the university, by the Augustus Wolfe Co., of land to the north of Packer Avenue. The converted Moravian Church did provided a building where instruction could proceed immediately.  And so on September 3, 1866, rather than 1867 or 1868 as initially planned, the first classes were held here, with the school having admitted 39 young men.

The building served many functions in the first years, including those of a Chemical laboratory, a library, chapel, classroom space, dorm rooms, and the President's office.  With the university quickly growing, in 1872 Saucon Hall was built 50 feet to the east of Christmas Hall. In 1906, the newly formed marching band met here. And a half century later, the two structures would be integrated with the construction of a hyphen in 1927.  It was home to the Mathematics Department until 2019, when it was moved to Chandler-Ullman Hall. It currently houses the study abroad offices, LGBT and African students resource centers, the office of student engagement, and administrative offices for Zoellner art center. However, large portions of the building remain empty.

Coppee Hall (1883)
Built to accommodate the gymnasium, it had a bowling alley on its ground floor and gymnasium space on the second floor. With the opening of Taylor Gym in 1914, Coppee Hall became the new home of the College of Arts and Sciences which now resides in Maginnes Hall. Renovated in spring 2003 it houses the Department of Journalism and Communication with the first floor housing classrooms, the second floor offices, and the third floor being the home of the university newspaper The Brown and White. It is constructed of Potsdam sandstone, with facings in stone of a lighter hue. It was planned by Addison Hutton, architect, of Philadelphia, valuable assistance in the elaboration of the details being rendered by Dr. Sargent of Cambridge. The building was named in honor of Lehigh's first president and professor of the arts, Henry Coppée.

Coxe Hall (1910)
Named after Eckley Brinton Coxe, it was built as a mining laboratory.  The construction was funded by his wife Sophia G. Coxe.  Both Eckley B. (an early member of the board of trustees) and wife Sophia, were major contributors to the university, notably so during the difficult times of the 1890s.  The building completed massive renovations in 2004 and was turned into the Baer International Center, housing the ESL Department, the Global Union, and the Study Abroad offices.

Drown Hall (1908)
Drown Hall was built as the student center; it became home of the business school before the creation of Rauch Business Center. It is now the home of the English Department.  It also has a student Writing and Math help center on the first floor.  It was named after university president Thomas Messinger Drown.

E.W. Fairchild-Martindale Library and Computing Center (1969, 1985)
A high technology edifice near Farrington Square, is of modern design and houses science and engineering collections, the Media Center, library and technology services staff, a computer center, and the Digital Media Studio.  The original part of the library, now FM-South, was constructed in 1969 as the Mart Science and Engineering Library, named after Leon T. Mart, Thomas L. Mart, and Clara W. Mart.  An addition that more than doubled the size of the library was completed in 1985 and the library was renamed after Harry T. Martindale, a Lehigh alumni, and his wife, Elizabeth, daughter of the late Edmund W. Fairchild, founder of a business-publications and communications empire. The center contains the university's research computing clusters.

Fritz Engineering Laboratory (1910, 1955)
The Fritz Engineering Laboratory was opened in 1910 and refurbished in the 1955. It is named after John Fritz. Opened in June 1910, the Fritz Engineering Laboratory symbolized Lehigh's dedication to an excellent engineering education. The original Fritz Engineering Laboratory included many state-of-the-art testing machines, including the 800,000-pound Riehle universal testing machine which was used to test many bridge components including pieces of the George Washington Bridge, the infamous Tacoma Narrows Bridge, and structural pieces used in the Panama Canal and Golden Gate Bridge. Steel for the Golden Gate Bridge was manufactured in Bethlehem, tested at Lehigh University, and then shipped away to be assembled and constructed. In 1953 a groundbreaking ceremony was held for a seven-story addition which would include a new universal testing machine. This five million pound load capacity universal testing machine built by Baldwin-Lima-Hamilton (BLH), was the largest machine of its time. The machine weighed over 450 tons and could test the tension and compression forces of structures up to 40 feet in height. Upon the reopening in 1955, Fritz Laboratory was once again a state-of-the-art testing center. The Baldwin universal testing machine, 76 feet tall including 16 feet below the test floor, was the largest test machine of its kind when it was installed. In addition to multiple testing machines, Fritz Lab also included laboratories for soil mechanics, sanitation, structural models, hydraulics, and concrete research. The lab allowed undergraduate and graduate students to study subjects such as reinforced concrete, the modeling of dams, and the strength of novel structural materials. In 1992, the original Fritz Laboratory was named as a Civil Engineering Landmark by the American Society of Civil Engineers. The John Fritz Engineering Laboratory also celebrated its 100th anniversary in October 2009 with a large celebration. During the three-day event, there were many speeches and activities to celebrate the legacy of John Fritz and the lab that he provided to Lehigh University. Fritz Lab, including the Riehle and BLH testing machines, are still used today by students, faculty, and researchers to test the strength of building components and gain new knowledge.

Grace Hall and Caruso Wrestling Complex (1942, 2013)
Grace Hall is home to Lehigh's nationally ranked wrestling and women's volleyball programs. The facility, known as "The Snake Pit", underwent a substantial renovation and re-opened in November 2003. The building's lower level, renamed Leeman-Turner Arena at Grace Hall, seats 2,200 and is also used for intramural and club sports, concerts and lectures. The upper level housed the Ulrich Student Center, including a movie theater, post office, and the studios of WLVR.  The building's upper floor was home to the ROTC and AFROTC departments from 1941 to 1994 and was dedicated as the Ulrich Student Center on April 7, 1995.  In the summer of 2012 renovation began to eliminate Ulrich Student Center converting the space into the Caruso Wrestling Complex. The new space will house a new hall of champions, coaches offices, and training space. The post office was relocated to Farrington Square, and the community service office relocated to the UC. There are no announced plans for Subversions, the Kenner Theater, WLVR or the lost club space.  It is named after Ronald J. Ulrich and Eugene Gifford Grace.
Dr. W. Ross Yates shares an interesting anecdote of the initial envisioning and construction of Grace Hall. "[Eugene G.] Grace asked [Lehigh President Clement C.] Williams how much it would cost, and Williams immediately replied, 'Three hundred thousand dollars.' .. 'I thought it would cost more,' Grace is reported to have said later, but he agreed to pay for the building."  Few if any building projects, writes Yates, have been more popular with the Lehigh community than the palaestra, Grace Hall.  All stood to gain something by it, as it could accommodate many and various large functions.  However, continues the professor, "[by] the time Grace Hall was completed the cost was more than twice Williams's original estimate.  Grace probably swallowed hard, but he paid the bills."  Eugene G. Grace was President of Bethlehem Steel.

Harold S. Mohler Laboratory 
Mohler Laboratory is home to the industrial and systems engineering department. The building used to be a Jewish Synagogue, and the original stained glass windows can still be seen.  It stands immediately adjacent to the main campus, across Brodhead Ave.

Johnson Hall (1954) 
This administrative building is home to several university offices, including Counseling Services, Chaplain's Office, Campus Police, Health and Wellness Center, and Parking Services.  Because of the slope of South Mountain, Johnson Hall is one of several buildings on Campus in which there are entrances on multiple levels.  The downhill (North) entrance is two floors below the South entrance.  Constructed of stone.

Lamberton Hall (1907)
The structure served as the university commons and dining room until the renovation of Packer Hall in 1958. The building honors the memory of Robert A. Lamberton, third president. The basement contained a small bore rifle range used by ROTC and the university rifle team. It housed the music department until its move to the Zoellner Arts Center. In January 2006 it reopened as a late-night diner and student programming facility.

Lewis Laboratory (1895)
The building is home to the Lehigh physics department, and named after Willard Deming Lewis, physicist and Lehigh's 10th and longest serving president (1964 - 1982). Destroyed by fire in 1900, it was quickly rebuilt. The fire was caused by curtains catching fire near an optics experiment. Due to communication problems, adequate equipment to put out the fire did not arrive until it was too late to save much of the building. It now houses a large lecture hall on the second floor, laboratories on the first and second floors, classrooms on the third floor, offices on the fourth floor, and more classrooms and laboratories on the fifth floor. It is also home to the advanced optics lab. Part of the Sherman Fairchild Center for the Physical Sciences: a three-part continuous building consisting of the historic Lewis Lab, the Sherman Fairchild Lab, and the auditorium and hallways (constructed during the 1980s, and generally considered part of Lewis Lab) that serves as a connector between the two main building sections, and the main entrance to the complex.

Linderman Library (1877)
Designed by Philadelphia architect Addison Hutton and built by founder Asa Packer as a memorial to his daughter, Lucy Packer Linderman. The original rotunda is surrounded except on the south by a major addition constructed in 1929 that was designed by Theodore C. Visscher and James L. Burley. The building houses more than 20,000 rare books and volumes related to the humanities and social sciences. The building was closed for extensive renovations from May 2005 until March 19, 2007, under the architects MGA Partners. The renovations added new classrooms and seminar rooms, a humanities commons, new computer technology, wired and wireless networking spaces for students working on team projects, a cafe, new climate control systems to preserve the collections and provide a comfortable environment for students, faculty and staff, and also enhanced building access and navigation for handicapped users.  The renovation also opened up the top floor which had previously been closed to the public.

Maginnes Hall (1971)
The offices of the College of Arts and Sciences and several of its departments are located in Maginnes Hall. In addition to classrooms and faculty offices, Maginnes houses the International Multimedia Resource Center and its "World View Room," where students and faculty can watch domestic and international cultural and news programs on wide-screen television down-linked via satellite. The ground floor of Maginnes used to house the University Bookstore which was relocated to Campus Square upon its completion. The building is connected to the STEPS building via a passageway on the second floor.  The dedication for the College of Arts and Science is interesting.  It reads:  Albert Bristol Maginnes  "Alumnus and Trustee of Lehigh University, he excelled in many fields: the law, athletics, music and the fine arts.  His life was one of integrity and service; his love of man, his gentleness and warmth of personality enriched those whose lives he touched.  He enabled many men to come to Lehigh University; he advised them to the life of inquiry and truth which was his own."  Mr. Maginnes was the Class of 1921.

McClintic-Marshall House (1957)
McClintic-Marshall House, commonly referred to as M&M, is a four-story, H-shaped building composed of sandstone. This dormitory was completed in 1957 by architect Frederick Larson. The structure was built in memory of Howard H. McClintic and Charles D. Marshall who both graduated from Lehigh University as Civil Engineers in 1888. In 1900, the pair formed a bridge building and steel fabrication firm, the McClintic-Marshall Construction Company. The company worked on significant projects including the George Washington Bridge, locks for the Panama Canal, and the Cathedral of Learning.

M&M is a freshman-only dorm, coeducational by section. The first floor serves as the main entry-way into the building. Located on the left (A) wing is a game room/lounge area with a billiards table, ping-pong table, some sofas, and a widescreen flat-panel plasma television. The right (B) wing of the ground floor has a luggage storage room and two laundry rooms. The top three floors provide residence to about 92 students each, making a total of 276. Each floor has two sections following the A and B layout which are separated by a shared lounge/study area. The sections are referenced by the wing followed by the floor number, i.e., A2 is the A wing of the second floor. Floor numbering is G, 1, 2, 3.

Neville Hall 
This building in the chemistry complex has three auditoriums used for lectures and events. The building is named for Dr. Harvey A. Neville, president from 1961 to 1964, who was a chemist. An interesting structure which forms an integrated complex with the Mudd building to the East, it is constructed of mirror-like glass and reddish brown brick.

Packard Laboratory (1929)
Named and funded by James Ward Packard, one of the inventors of the first Packard automobile, this building is a typical example of the collegiate gothic style. It serves as the headquarters for the P.C. Rossin College of Engineering and Applied Sciences. Within the building are several large lecture halls, an exhibit of the first Packard automobile, and many laboratories.
J. W. Packard '84, was a retiring individual and founder of the Packard Motor Car Company.  He chose to live in Ohio near the Pennsylvania border, rather than Detroit, and shunned publicity.  However, come the mid-1920s he realized he was dying, and wanted to do something for his alma mater.  This happened to be a time of great expansion for the university.  Corresponding with president C. R. Richards, and Eugene G. Grace, head of Bethlehem Steel, it was decided he would aid with the design and construction of the new laboratory for Mechanical and Electrical Engineering.  Upon giving Lehigh a gift of securities amounting to a million dollars, the design was commenced by alumni T.C. "Speed" Visscher '99 and J.L. Burley '94.  Mr. Packard had notified the school that he wanted a design combining functional utility and artistic beauty.  University architects Visscher and Burley, working with various professors, and town architect A. W. Litzenburger, finished a plan, yet they soon realized an extra $200,000 was needed to complete it as envisioned.  W R. Okeson, a university official and an alumni contact, sent this news to Packard, who duly mailed back a check for the extra $200,000.  An intriguing rectangular, Gothic building, Packard Lab remains a university landmark.

Packer Memorial Church (1887)

The chapel was built as the campus' Episcopal church, but is now an interfaith facility.  On Sundays, Roman-Catholic mass is usually held at 9:10 pm and 12:10 pm; on Fridays, Muslim prayer is held at 1:10 pm. It is also available for weddings in which at least one of the parties is a Lehigh University student or alumnus. It used to be the location of the freshman convocation which is held during orientation at the beginning of each school year, however due to the growing class size, in 2007 convocation was moved to the larger Baker Auditorium in the Zoellner Arts Center.
Designed by Addison Hutton in a robust gothic revival style, it has red slate brought  from Vermont.  The church, sometimes referred to as a chapel, has one of the three towers on campus, with the others being Packer Hall (the "UC"), and the Alumni Mem. Bld.

Packer Hall, the University Center, Clayton University Center (1868)
When it was first built, it housed a chapel, classrooms, offices, drafting rooms, and dormitories.  It is was the first building specifically built for Lehigh University.  It now under renovation.
As the years passed functional use of the dignified building of Packer have naturally changed.  In 1958, during the Whitaker administration, and as part of a more general effort to modernize and update much of the campus, a massive three story stone addition was placed on the south, or mountain, side.  This provided increased room for dining halls, lounges, facilities, a snack bar, and even for a short time the bookstore (until it was moved to the basement of Maginnes Hall in 1970).  From the exterior, it is difficult to see where the old building leaves off and the new begins, for as W. Ross Yates notes, the administrators took care to preserve many of the lineaments of the original structure.  Prior to its 2022-2023 renovations it housed student and faculty dining facilities, food courts, deans' offices, the military science (ROTC) department, the Women's Center, The Center for Academic Success, Office of Multicultural Affairs, The Pride Center (LGBTQIA Programs and Outreach), a bank office, and conference facilities.

Price Hall (1899)
Originally named Die Alte Brauerei, the building belonged to an independent brewery located at the border of the original campus, it was purchased by Lehigh in 1899, allegedly because then university president, Robert H. Sayre deemed an off campus brewery as a bad influence. It kept its name until it was renamed after Dr. Henry R. Price, an alumnus of the class of 1870, and the then president of the board of trustees, in 1916 during a renovation that turned it into a dormitory. However, its status as a dorm was abandoned due to its small size. Price hall has largely sat empty since the 60's but was temporally used as the home for portions of the psychology and math departments during renovations to Chandler-Ullman from 2018 to 2019. The building currently house the LU Facilities offices.

The Quad (1938-1948)
Previously called the "Freshman Quad", the classic collegiate stone residence halls of Dravo House and Richards House now room freshman, while Drinker House is home to upperclassmen.  All are massive stone structures composed largely during the depression, and are Lehigh's highest structures, with respect to altitude, outside of Sayre Park, and on the main (Asa Packer) campus.  A fourth was planned but never constructed, and therefore the number of dormitories here stand at three, in an informal triangular setting.

Rathbone Hall (1972)
Completed in 1972 as the upperclass dining hall for the Centennials and named after Monroe Jackson Rathbone, it is modern in appearance and seems to hang off the mountain, being built in a very steep section and having ground floor access to each of its floors.  The main part of the building is one of Lehigh's dining halls, offering sweeping views of the Lehigh Valley from the dining room.  The lower floors of the building house offices and service areas.

Rauch Business Center (1990)
Home of the university's College of Business and Economics, comprises  of floor space on five stories and also houses the Career Services Office, and the Perella Financial Services Lab. Opened in 1990 on the site of the former Taylor Stadium.  It is named after Philip Rauch.

Sayre Park (1997)
The upper half of the Packer Campus is Sayre Park, commonly called "The Hill". This former parkland now houses all Greek houses and the Sayre Park Residential Complex which houses 146 upperclassmen in three residential buildings and one common building.

Seeley G. Mudd Building 
A seven-story building, constructed during the latter years of the W. Deming Lewis presidency, this houses laboratories and resources for chemistry students, and the chemistry department.  The state-of-the-art equipment residing here includes an electron spectrometer for chemical analysis (ESCA), one of ten in the world, and the department's unique nuclear magnetic resonance imaging facility.

Sinclair Laboratory 
Sinclair Laboratory serves one of the university's main research centers, including the Center for Optical Technologies, the International Materials Institute for Glass Forming, and an electron spectrometer for chemical analysis (ESCA), one of ten in the world.

STEPS Building (2010)
The  building on the corner of Packer Avenue and Vines Street was designed by Bohlin Cywinski Jackson architects, and opened in August 2010. STEPS stands for "Science, Technology, Environment, Policy and Society," and contains classrooms and laboratories mostly for the Earth & Environmental Science, Civil and Environmental Engineering, Chemistry and Biology departments. STEPS is supposed to represent “science in sight” so many of the labs are open. The Open style of the building is meant to represent and foster the open discussion from the various departments in the building. It contains many "green" features, including low flush toilets, heat shields to recycle energy from fume hoods, exhaust fans, and green roof to prevent soil runoff and hold in heat/AC. Outside STEPS there is a petrified tree stone that is over 360 million years old.

Taylor House (1907)
Taylor House is a dormitory for upperclass students at Lehigh University. It houses 145 sophomores in coeducational hallways.

Taylor, as the building is commonly named, is located next to the McClintic-Marshall House and across from the Trembley Park Apartments. It is shaped in a U divided into three sections. Each of these sections has lounge called either the red, blue, or green lounge. The lounges contain a small kitchen and a television set. Many of the rooms in Taylor Hall are doubles, interspersed with several singles throughout the building.

Taylor is one of the earliest concrete structures ever built. It was the gift of industrialist Andrew Carnegie in honor of his friend and associate, Lehigh trustee Charles L. Taylor, Class of 1876. In 1984 the building underwent a complete renovation.

Taylor Gymnasium (1907)
The Taylor Gymnasium is home to the Lehigh Athletics Administrative and Coaches offices. It houses the Welch Fitness Center, Basketball Courts, Swimming Pools, Studio (Multi-purpose room), Locker Rooms, Penske Lehigh Athletics Hall of Fame, the Athletics Partnership, Athletic Store, and Youth Camps/Clinics Office. This building is named after Charles L. Taylor,  although it sits on a street named Taylor, after Zachary Taylor.

Taylor Stadium (1914-1987)
Named after Charles L. Taylor, Taylor Stadium was designed by architect Henry Hornbostel and engineer Charles W. Leavitt and financed by alumni donations, largely from Charles M. Schwab.  Located adjacent to Taylor Gymnasium, it sat at the intersection of Taylor Street and Packer Avenue, and was demolished in 1987 for the construction of the Rauch Business Center and the Zoellner Arts Center. Goodman Stadium was built in 1987 as its replacement. All that remains of Taylor Stadium is the foundations of the south grandstand and a memorial consisting of a plaque and the original sign and dedication.

Trembley Park 
This apartment complex is located right in the middle of campus. It houses 176 upperclass students in four-person apartments that have one double and two single bedrooms, plus a kitchen, furnished living room/dining room and a private bathroom. The complex was intended to be temporary housing and has a design which contains no internal load bearing walls, allowing for the university to reconfigure the floor plan at any time.

Whitaker Laboratory (1960)
It was built in 1960 and named after Martin Dewey Whitaker as the metallurgy and chemical engineering building.  The Metallurgy Department has since become the Materials Science and Engineering Department, and is now the sole department in the building.  Whitaker Lab consists of two major wings, the south wing a two floor section containing three lecture halls and the main entrance to the building, and the north wing, which is five floors high and contains offices, classrooms, and labs.  The two wings are connected by an elevated walkway on the third floor.  It is connected to the Mudd Building by a tunnel on the first floor.

Wilbur Powerhouse 
This 17,000 square foot facility is open to all students from across the university's various colleges, involved in three of Lehigh's most innovative and multi-disciplinary programs: the master's degree in Technical Entrepreneurship (TE), Integrated Product Development (IPD), and Integrated Business and Engineering (IBE). The building includes the new Additive Manufacturing Lab (AML) supporting 3D printing on campus, a Mac and PC computer lab supporting 2D and 3D design and manufacturing, prototyping shops, teamwork areas, and A-V/HDTV meeting- and class-rooms.

It was built as a functional powerhouse for the lower campus in the early 20th century. It housed engineering labs, and eventually the Theater Department's “Wilbur Drama Workshop” black box theater (until the construction and opening of the Zoellner Arts Center in 1996–1998).

In 2002, the Wilbur Powerhouse was completely renovated, and has been in operation supporting the above programs and many others since then.

Williams Hall (1904)

A Beaux Arts style three-story brick structure was designed by Allentown architecture firm, Jacob Weishampel and Biggin.  The building used to contain classrooms and laboratories for the Departments of Biological Sciences and of Earth and Environmental Sciences.  A Vivarium was added in 1930 designed by architects Theodore Visscher and James Burley of New York.  This structure, located to the south of Williams Hall, is attached to the main building via an enclosed bridge.  A fire destroyed the wood attic and third floor and in 1956 the building was remodeled including a new fourth floor.    The modern facilities were available to support research in many areas including geochemistry; stable-isotope geochemistry; geochronology; paleomagnetics; seismology and high resolution geophysics; aquatic and ecosystems ecology; GIS and quantitative geomorphology; and water quality.  The building was rededicated in the fall of 2015, after a period of renovations, and now houses offices from Student Affairs and academic departments including modern language and literature, religion studies, sociology, anthropology.

Zoellner Arts Center (1997)
Zoellner Arts Center is a  arts center located on the campus of Lehigh University in Bethlehem, Pennsylvania, in the United States.  It opened in 1997, and houses the following facilities:

 Baker Hall - a 946-seat auditorium with multi-purpose proscenium stage, suited for concerts, stage productions, ceremonies and lectures.
 Diamond Theater - a small 309-seat 3/4 thrust theater with steeply raked stadium seating suited for theatrical and small music groups.
 Black Box Theater - a smaller 125-seat theater
 A two-story art gallery
 Additional facilities including several rehearsal rooms, recording studio, dance studio, practice rooms, scene shop, costume shop, dressing rooms and green room, classrooms, music library, box office, faculty and staff offices, and three large lobbies and a 345-car parking deck attached to the building.
 It is also home to the Music and Theater Departments.

The venue has had a wide array of performers, including the New York Philharmonic and Itzhak Perlman, the Tuvan throat singers Huun-Huur-Tu and Laurie Anderson, Hubbard Street Dance Chicago, MOMIX, the Aquila Theatre Company, Lily Tomlin, Bernadette Peters and Queen Latifah.

The building was designed by Dagit Saylor Architects in Philadelphia, and is named after Victoria E. and Robert E. Zoellner.

Mountaintop Campus
Built as the Homer Research Labs of Bethlehem Steel this  campus was acquired by Lehigh in 1986 and is home to the College of Education and numerous facilities for the Civil Engineering, Chemical Engineering, and Biological Sciences departments.  Comprehensive, 270 degree views of the Lehigh Valley are obtained from some of the principal buildings.

Iacocca Hall (1958)
Iacocca Hall was built as the Homer Research Labs of the Bethlehem Steel Corporation. It is also known as the tower building and houses the College of Education, the chemical engineering department, the biological sciences department, a dining room, food services facilities, and a teleconferencing classroom.

Building C

Building C also originally belonged to the Bethlehem Steel Corporation. It houses the Mountaintop Initiative and was renovated in 2017 to house the Art, Architecture, and Design department as well as the Computer Science & Engineering department.

Imbt Laboratories
This building hosts the Advanced Technology for Large Structural Systems (ATLSS) Engineering Research Center and the Energy Research Center.

Sayre Field (1966)
Located on South Mountain, the field is used for intramural sports.  The only truly flat area on South Mountain, it comprises roughly 10 acres.  It was attained by Lehigh as an exercise and sporting field during the complex property purchasing and swapping of the 1950s to 1960s.  The latter was led and orchestrated by Bethlehem Steel, and involved the university with the town, along with other public and private concerns, including Moravian College.

Murray H. Goodman Campus (1960)
The Saucon Valley Playing Fields were renamed after Murray H. Goodman, alumnus and key contributor to the university during the difficult days of the 1980s, when Bethlehem Steel suffered decline.  The land, embracing six hundred acres, was obtained during the complex expansion days for Steel, being the early post War period (1950s - 1960s).  During the latter Lehigh agreed to purchase the property for roughly one thousand dollars per acre.  The Campus sits on the relatively flat lands of Saucon Valley, which is south of South Mountain and across Interstate 78 from the other two campuses.  Primarily a sporting campus, it contains the Stabler Convocation Center, and its only on campus graduate housing.  The new football stadium resides here, as do most of Lehigh's other athletic facilities, including fields for Baseball and Softball, outdoor track, Tennis and Squash courts, and numerous practice fields.  The following are the major structures and arenas:

Cundey Varsity House
A strength-training center for Lehigh athletic teams. It includes a 5,000-square foot weight room, locker rooms for eight sports, meeting rooms and sports medicine facilities.

Murray H. Goodman Stadium (1988)

A 16,000 capacity stadium, Goodman Stadium has a three-tiered press box and limited chair back seating, and locker rooms for home and visiting teams.  With views of South Mountain, it has been named "Best Game Atmosphere" by a Patriot League publication.  It was erected in 1988 using a large grassy 'bowl' that had long-awaited construction.

Mulvihill Golf Learning Center (2007)
Provides indoor swing analysis and putting facilities, and outdoor driving range, practice bunkers, and putting greens for developing golf skills.  Lehigh's home venue for golf meets are the three highly rated courses of the nearby Saucon Valley Country Club, which has hosted six USGA tournaments including the USPGA Senior Open and the LPGA Women's US Open.

Rauch Field House (1977)
Provides indoor practice fields, an indoor running track, and locker rooms for the various teams.

Stabler Arena & Convocation Center (1979)
A 6,000 capacity arena for concerts, sports (including Lehigh's basketball teams), and other events.

Ulrich Sports Complex (1999)
A dual field complex for men's and women's soccer, men's and women's lacrosse, and field hockey. The complex has natural grass and artificial turf. Permanent seating, a press box and lighting are available.

Notes 

 
Lehigh University
Educational institutions accredited by the Council on Occupational Education
Lists of university and college buildings in the United States
Lehigh University